Pallavolo Cisterna 88 is an Italian women's volleyball club based in Cisterna di Latina and currently playing in the Serie C.

Previous names
Due to sponsorship, the club have competed under the following names:
 Pallavolo Cisterna 88 (1988–2013)
 Omia Volley 88 (2013–2015)
 Omia Cisterna (2015–present)

History
The club was established in 1988 as the volleyball department of Polisportiva Cisterna 88. The club has many teams (girls, youth, junior and senior) playing at different competitions. The senior team has participated in the Series C, B2, B1 and in 2015 was promoted to Serie A2. At the conclusion of the 2016–17 season, following its relegation from Serie A2 to Serie B1, the club decided to reorganize and focus on its youth team competing at Serie C.

Venue
The club play its home matches at the Palasport Del Campus Dei Licei Ramadù (also known as PalaRamadù) in Cisterna di Latina. The venue has approximately 600 spectators capacity.

During a brief period in 2015 (between October and December) the club moved from PalaRamadù to Palazzetto dello Sport "Tiziano Ciotti" in Anagni.

Team
This was the last Serie A2 club squad, Season 2016–2017, as of March 2017.

References

External links
 Official website 

Italian women's volleyball clubs
Volleyball clubs established in 1988
1988 establishments in Italy
Sport in Lazio
Cisterna di Latina